Stellaconus is a synonym of Conus (Splinoconus) da Motta, 1991: synonym of Conus Linnaeus, 1758. These are sea snails, marine gastropod mollusks in the family Conidae, the cone snails and their allies.

Species
The following species are alternate representation:
 Stellaconus bayani (Jousseaume, 1872): synonym of Conus bayani Jousseaume, 1872 (alternate representation)
 Stellaconus bondarevi (Röckel & G. Raybaudi Massilia, 1992): synonym of Conus bondarevi Röckel & G. Raybaudi Massilia, 1992 (alternate representation)
 Stellaconus capitanellus (Fulton, 1938): synonym of Conus capitanellus Fulton, 1938 (alternate representation)
 Stellaconus malacanus (Hwass in Bruguière, 1792): synonym of Conus malacanus Hwass in Bruguière, 1792 (alternate representation)
 Stellaconus sukhadwalai (Röckel & da Motta, 1983): synonym of Conus sukhadwalai Röckel & da Motta, 1983 (alternate representation)
 Stellaconus troendlei (Moolenbeek, Zandbergen & Bouchet, 2008): synonym of Conus troendlei Moolenbeek, Zandbergen & Bouchet, 2008 (alternate representation)

References

External links
 To World Register of Marine Species

Conidae